The 8123 Tour is the fourth headlining concert tour by the American rock band The Maine, in support of their fourth studio album "Forever Halloween" (2013). The tour currently consists of 37 shows in North America. The tour kicked off at a free hometown show at Tempe Marketplace in Tempe, Arizona.

The tour has been independently put on by The Maine's management team, 81 Twenty Three.  The original tour line-up consists of headliner The Maine, their management-mates This Century, and fellow music business friends in A Rocket To The Moon and Brighten and visits 38 dates over 37 North American cities.

The tour is unique in that fans are invited to check in regularly on the official Eighty One Twenty Three website where each of the four bands will be constantly updating the blog with an abundance of behind-the-scenes content. Fans will be in for a few surprises along the way and will be given access to the first official 8123 pop-up shop as well as an exclusive materials including a download at the end of the tour of live recordings from the shows.  Content such as tour video updates can be viewed here, here, and here.

The tour came back to Manila, Philippines as the first leg of the tour which happened in SM North EDSA Skydome on January 12, 2014.

On May 14 2014, 8123 announced the tour would play a leg in the UK in October 2014

Opening acts
 A Rocket To The Moon
 This Century
 Brighten

Set lists
From the June 22, 2013 Chicago, Illinois show at Bottom Lounge
The Maine
 Love & Drugs
 Misery
 Inside of You
 We All Roll Along
 Into Your Arms
 Right Girl
 Happy
 Some Days
 Kennedy Curse
 My Heroine
 These Four Words
 Whoever She Is
 Identify
 Girls Just Want to Have Fun (Cyndi Lauper cover)
 Count 'Em One, Two, Three
 Like We Did (Windows Down)
 We'll All Be...

A Rocket To The Moon
 Call It All Home
 If Only They Knew
 Wild & Free
 Whole Lotta You
 Baby Blue Eyes
 If I'm Gonna Fall In Love
 Dakota
 Give a Damn
 Annabelle
 Like We Used To
 Mr. Right 

This Century
 Hopeful Romantic
 Tip Toe
 Skeletons
 To Love and Back
 Everywhere Everything
 Bleach Blonde
 Slow Dance Night
 Sound of Fire 

Brighten
N/A

Tour dates

References

2013 concert tours